Alexei Yurievich Kitaev (born August 26, 1963) is a Russian–American professor of physics at the California Institute of Technology and permanent member of the Kavli Institute for Theoretical Physics. He is best known for introducing the quantum phase estimation algorithm and the concept of the topological quantum computer while working at the Landau Institute for Theoretical Physics.  For this work, he was awarded a MacArthur Fellowship in 2008. He is also known for introducing the complexity class QMA and showing the 2-local Hamiltonian problem is QMA-complete, the most complete result for k-local Hamiltonians. Kitaev is also known for contributions to research on a model relevant to researchers of the AdS/CFT correspondence started by  Subir Sachdev and Jinwu Ye; this model is known as the Sachdev–Ye–Kitaev (SYK) model.

Kitaev was educated in Russia, receiving an M.Sc. from the Moscow Institute of Physics and Technology (1986), and a Ph.D. from the Landau Institute for Theoretical Physics (1989).  He served previously as a researcher (1999–2001) at Microsoft Research, a research associate (1989–1998) at the Landau Institute and a professor at Caltech (2002–present).

Honors and awards
In 2008 Kitaev was awarded a MacArthur Fellowship.

In July 2012, he was an inaugural awardee of the Breakthrough Prize in Fundamental Physics, the creation of physicist and internet entrepreneur, Yuri Milner.

In 2015, he was jointly awarded the 2015 Dirac Medal by ICTP.

In 2017, he was, together with Xiao-Gang Wen, the winner of the Oliver E. Buckley Condensed Matter Prize.

In 2021, he was elected into the National Academy of Sciences.

Political positions 
In February–March 2022, he signed an open letter by Breakthrough Prize laureates condemning the 2022 Russian invasion of Ukraine.

See also

Solovay–Kitaev theorem
Curvature Renormalization Group Method
Magic state distillation
Quantum circuit
Quantum threshold theorem
Quantum Interactive Polynomial time
Topological entanglement entropy
Toric code
Sachdev–Ye–Kitaev model

References

External links
 http://www.macfound.org/fellows/802/

Living people
MacArthur Fellows
California Institute of Technology faculty
Soviet physicists
20th-century American physicists
Russian activists against the 2022 Russian invasion of Ukraine
Simons Investigator
Quantum information scientists
Moscow Institute of Physics and Technology alumni
Oliver E. Buckley Condensed Matter Prize winners
Members of the United States National Academy of Sciences
1963 births